The Giucoșin ( or Ђукошина речица/Đukošina rečica) is a left tributary of the river Aranca in Romania and Serbia. It discharges into the Aranca (Zlatica) near Jazovo. Today, it is for the most part a dry riverbed because the water flows into the Kikinda Canal, part of the Danube-Tisa-Danube water system.

References

Rivers of Romania
Rivers of Timiș County
Rivers of Serbia